Nottoway may refer to any of the following, in the United States:

People 
 Nottoway people, an Iroquoian tribe of Virginia
 Nottoway language, spoken by the Nottoway people

Geographic locations 
 Nottoway River, a river in Virginia
 Nottoway County, Virginia, a county in Virginia
 Nottoway, Virginia, an unincorporated community
 Nottoway Correctional Center
 Nottoway County Courthouse
 Nottoway County High School

Namesakes 
 USS Nottoway, a United States Navy harbor tug formerly named 
 Nottoway Plantation, fifty miles upriver from New Orleans, in Louisiana

See also 
 Nottawa (disambiguation)

Language and nationality disambiguation pages